Buford is an unincorporated community and census-designated place (CDP) in Lancaster County, South Carolina, United States. It was first listed as a CDP in the 2020 census with a population of 398. It lies at the intersection of South Carolina Highways 9 and 522.

History
The community was named after Abraham Buford (1747–1833), commanding officer during the Waxhaw Massacre.

Education
Public education in Buford is administered by Lancaster County School District. The district operates Buford Elementary School and Buford Middle School and Buford High School.

Demographics

2020 census

Note: the US Census treats Hispanic/Latino as an ethnic category. This table excludes Latinos from the racial categories and assigns them to a separate category. Hispanics/Latinos can be of any race.

References

Unincorporated communities in Lancaster County, South Carolina
Unincorporated communities in South Carolina
Census-designated places in Lancaster County, South Carolina
Census-designated places in South Carolina